Antoine André Louis Reynaud (12 September 1771 – 24 February 1844) was a French mathematician.

He was a Knight of the Legion of Honour and examiner at the École Polytechnique.

Works

See also
Euclidean algorithm

External links 
 

French mathematicians
1844 deaths
1771 births